The Centennial Building (also known as the Civic Center) is a historic site in Port St. Joe, Florida. It is located at 300 Allen Memorial Way, across from the Constitution Convention Museum State Park. On March 12, 1996, it was added to the U.S. National Register of Historic Places.

References

External links
  at 
 
 
 

Buildings and structures in Gulf County, Florida
Government buildings on the National Register of Historic Places in Florida
National Register of Historic Places in Gulf County, Florida